Edyta Herbuś (born 26 February 1981) is a Polish dancer, model, and actress. Edyta was the winner of the Eurovision Dance Contest 2008 with partner Marcin Mroczek representing Poland.

Biography

Born in Kielce, Poland, Edyta has a degree in characterization with theatre and movie make up. She attended the dance school  Step by Step in Kielce. She took part in the second and fourth Polish edition of Dancing with the Stars. In the second edition, she danced with Jakub Wesołowski, in the fourth with Marcin Mroczek - twice she and her partner ranked third. In Otwock she has a Dance School together with Tomek Barański. In 2007, she took part in Jak oni śpiewają?, in which she placed fourth. In a Polish daily soap Na wspólnej she played the role of Urszula. She also starred in Tylko miłość.
In Latin American dancing she has the category S class in which she has won many awards.
In Poland she was first vicemiss of Miss Hawaiian Tropic 2004, in Las Vegas was Talent Miss.

Eurovision dance

She also appeared on the Eurovision Dance Contest 2008 which she won on September 6 for Poland, giving the country its first ever win in an EBU produced contest.

Filmography
  (a Russian TV series) (2009)
Małgosia kontra Małgosia as Małgosia (2008)
Świat według Kiepskich as reporter (2007)
Tylko miłość as Zuzanna Karaś (2007)
Na Wspólnej as Urszula (2006–2007)
Kryminalni as waitress and prostitute (2004 and 2007)
Plebania (2003)

Dubbing 
7 krasnoludków: Las to za mało - historia jeszcze prawdziwsza – Snow White (2007)
Wyspa dinozaura – Frania (2006)

Her programs
Przebojowe dzieci
W rytmie MTV

Programs she took part in 
Dancing with the Stars (Polish)
Jak oni śpiewają?
Dzień Kangura

References

External links 

 
 Polish stars: Edyta Herbus in photoes
 Edyta Herbuś on YouTube

1981 births
Living people
Actors from Kielce
Polish actresses
Polish voice actresses
Polish female dancers
21st-century Polish singers
21st-century Polish women singers